The word bluebead is used in the common name for each of several species of flowering plants in the genus Clintonia, including:

 Clintonia andrewsiana, the western bluebead lily
 Clintonia borealis, the bluebead lily
 Clintonia uniflora, the blue-bead lily, or simply the blue bead

See also

 Bluebeam (disambiguation)
 Bluebeard (disambiguation)
 Bluebeat (disambiguation)